The 2007 Men's Junior World Handball Championship was the 16th edition of the tournament and was held at Skopje and Ohrid, Macedonia from August 13–26, 2007.

Venues 
Two Macedonian cities were selected as hosts for the Championship:

Format 
For the preliminary round, 20 teams were allocated into 4 groups where the top 3 from each group advanced to the next round. In the main round, the remaining 12 teams were divided into 2 groups of 6. The top 2 teams from each group moved on to the semifinals and the winners battled in the championship game.

Preliminary round

Group A 

All times are local (UTC+2).

Group B

Group C

Group D

Main round

Group I

Group II

Placement matches

11th/12th

9th/10th

7th/8th

5th/6th

Final round

Semifinals

Bronze medal match

Gold medal match

Final standings

All-star team 
 Goalkeeper: 
 Left wing: 
 Left back: 
 Pivot: 
 Centre back: 
 Right back: 
 Right wing:

External links 
 

2007 in handball
International handball competitions hosted by North Macedonia
World Handball Championship youth and junior tournaments
2007 in Republic of Macedonia sport